Eccles is a census-designated place (CDP) in Raleigh County, West Virginia, United States. Eccles has a post office with ZIP code 25836. As of the 2010 census, its population is 362.

The community was originally named after the book Ecclesiastes, where the mining company of its namesake was formed around the turn of the century. The name was later shortened by the local post office to Eccles to allow for easier postage and mail flow due to a common inability to correctly spell the name. Eccles is the site of the April 28, 1914 Eccles coal mining disaster, which took the lives of 180 men.

References

Census-designated places in Raleigh County, West Virginia
Census-designated places in West Virginia
Coal towns in West Virginia